Sinton is a surname. Notable people with the surname include:

Andy Sinton (born 1966), English footballer and manager
David Sinton, Irish born industrialist in Ohio
David Sinton Ingalls, American politician, great-grandson of David Sinton
John Alexander Sinton, Irish soldier and winner of the Victoria Cross (first cousin once-removed of Maynard Sinton)
John Sinton (1835–1890), Irish-linen manufacturer; younger brother of Thomas Sinton, grandfather of John Alexander Sinton
Les Sinton, English footballer
Maynard Sinton, son of Thomas Sinton
 Nell Sinton (1910–1997), American painter
Thomas Sinton, Irish linen industrialist (cousin of David Sinton), great-uncle of John Alexander Sinton